A button is a  fastener that joins two pieces of fabric together by slipping through a loop or by sliding through a buttonhole.

In modern clothing and fashion design, buttons are commonly made of plastic but also may be made of metal, wood, or seashell. Buttons can also be used on containers such as wallets and bags. Buttons may be sewn onto garments and similar items exclusively for purposes of ornamentation. In the applied arts and craft, a button can be an example of folk art, studio craft, or even a miniature work of art. In archaeology, a button can be a significant artifact.

History

Buttons and button-like objects used as ornaments or seals rather than fasteners have been discovered in the Indus Valley civilization during its Kot Diji phase (c. 2800–2600 BC), at the Tomb of the Eagles, Scotland (2200-1800 BC), and at Bronze Age sites in China (c. 2000–1500 BC) and Ancient Rome.

Buttons made from seashell were used in the Indus Valley Civilization for ornamental purposes by 2000 BC. Some buttons were carved into geometric shapes and had holes pierced into them so that they could be attached to clothing with thread. Ian McNeil (1990) holds that "the button was originally used more as an ornament than as a fastening, the earliest known being found at Mohenjo-daro in the Indus Valley. It is made of a curved shell and about 5000 years old."

Egypt’s Eighteenth Dynasty left behind ornate wig covers, fabricated through sewing buttons formed of precious metals onto strips of backing material.

Leatherwork from the Roman Empire incorporates some of the first buttonholes, with the legionary Loculus (satchel) closed through the insertion of a metallic buckle, or button into a leather slit. A similar mechanism would later feature in early medieval footwear.
Buttons appeared as a means to close cuffs in the Byzantine Empire and to fasten the necks of Egyptian tunics by no later than the 5th century.

As authentication 
Buttons are sometimes used as access control for festivals, such as for the La Kermesse Franco-Americaine Festival in Biddeford, Maine.

As containers
Since at least the seventeenth century, when box-like metal buttons were constructed especially for the purpose, buttons have been one of the items in which drug smugglers have attempted to hide and transport illegal substances. At least one modern smuggler has tried to use this method.

Also making use of the storage possibilities of metal buttons, during the World Wars, British and U.S. military locket buttons were made, containing miniature working compasses.

Materials and manufacture

Because buttons have been manufactured from almost every possible material, both natural and synthetic, and combinations of both, the history of the material composition of buttons reflects the timeline of materials technology.

Buttons can be individually crafted by artisans, craftspeople or artists from raw materials or found objects (for example fossils), or a combination of both. Alternatively, they can be the product of low-tech cottage industry or can be mass-produced in high-tech factories. Buttons made by artists are art objects, known to button collectors as "studio buttons" (or simply "studios", from studio craft).

In 1918, the US government made an extensive survey of the international button market, which listed buttons made of vegetable ivory, metal, glass, galalith, silk, linen, cotton-covered crochet, lead, snap fasteners, enamel, rubber, buckhorn, wood, horn, bone, leather, paper, pressed cardboard, mother-of-pearl, celluloid, porcelain, composition, tin, zinc, xylonite, stone, cloth-covered wooden forms, and papier-mâché. Vegetable ivory was said to be the most popular for suits and shirts, and papier-mâché far and away the commonest sort of shoe button.

Nowadays, hard plastic, seashell, metals, and wood are the most common materials used in button-making; the others tending to be used only in premium or antique apparel, or found in collections.

Over 60% of the world's button supply comes from Qiaotou, Yongjia County, China.

Decoration and coating techniques
Historically, fashions in buttons have also reflected trends in applied aesthetics and the applied visual arts, with buttonmakers using techniques from jewellery making, ceramics, sculpture, painting, printmaking, metalworking, weaving and others. The following are just a few of the construction and decoration techniques that have been used in button-making:

Styles of attachment

Shank buttons have a hollow protrusion on the back through which thread is sewn to attach the button. Button shanks may be made from a separate piece of the same or a different substance as the button itself, and added to the back of the button, or be carved or moulded directly onto the back of the button, in which latter case the button is referred to by collectors as having a 'self-shank'.
Flat or sew-through buttons have holes through which thread is sewn to attach the button. Flat buttons may be attached by sewing machine rather than by hand, and may be used with heavy fabrics by working a thread shank to extend the height of the button above the fabric.
Toggles are stick-like, with a cord attached at the center. They are passed endways through a hole and then rotated sideways.
Stud buttons (also push-through buttons or just studs) are composed from an actual button, connected to a second, button-like element by a narrow metal or plastic bar. Pushed through two opposing holes within what is meant to be kept together, the actual button and its counterpart press it together, keeping it joined. Popular examples of such buttons are shirt studs and cufflinks.
Snap fasteners (also pressure buttons or press studs) are metal (usually brass) round discs pinched through the fabric. They are often found on clothing, in particular on denim pieces such as pants and jackets. They are more securely fastened to the material. As they rely on a metal rivet attached securely to the fabric, pressure buttons are difficult to remove without compromising the fabric's integrity. They are made of two couples: the male stud couple and the female stud couple. Each couple has one front (or top) and rear (or bottom) side (the fabric goes in the middle).
Magnetic buttons, as the name implies, are buttons that attach to each other by being magnetic. The buttons can be attached either by sewing or snapping them into the fabric.

Fabric buttons
Covered buttons are fabric-covered forms with a separate back piece that secures the fabric over the knob.
Mandarin buttons or frogs are knobs made of intricately knotted strings. Mandarin buttons are a key element in Mandarin dress (Qi Pao and cheongsam in Chinese), where they are closed with loops. Pairs of mandarin buttons worn as cuff links are called silk knots.
Worked or cloth buttons are created by embroidering or crocheting tight stitches (usually with linen thread) over a knob or ring called a form. Dorset buttons, handmade from the 17th century to 1750, and Death head buttons are of this type.

Button sizes
The size of the button depends on its use. Shirt buttons are generally small, and spaced close together, whereas coat buttons are larger and spaced further apart. Buttons are commonly measured in lignes (also called lines and abbreviated L), with 40 lines equal to 1 inch. For example, some standard sizes of buttons are 16 lignes (10.16 mm, standard buttons of men's shirts) and 32 lignes (20.32 mm, typical button on suit jackets).

In museums and galleries

Some museums and art galleries hold culturally, historically, politically, and/or artistically significant buttons in their collections. The Victoria and Albert Museum has many buttons, particularly in its jewellery collection, as does the Smithsonian Institution.

Hammond Turner & Sons, a button-making company in Birmingham, hosts an online museum with an image gallery and historical button-related articles, including an 1852 article on button-making by Charles Dickens. In the US, large button collections are on public display at the Waterbury Button Museum of Waterbury, Connecticut, the Keep Homestead Museum of Monson, Massachusetts, which also hosts an extensive button archive,  and in Gurnee, Illinois, at The Button Room.

Gallery

Positioning
Classic clothing has the button on the left side for women and on the right side for men.  Some Jews reverse this.

In politics
The mainly American tradition of politically significant clothing buttons appears to have begun with the first presidential inauguration of George Washington in 1789. Known to collectors as "Washington Inaugurals", they were made of copper, brass or Sheffield plate, in large sizes for coats and smaller sizes for breeches. Made in twenty-two patterns and hand-stamped, they are now extremely valuable cultural artifacts.

Between about 1840 and 1916, clothing buttons were used in American political campaigns, and still exist in collections today. Initially, these buttons were predominantly made of brass (though horn and rubber buttons with stamped or moulded designs also exist) and had loop shanks. Around 1860 the badge or pin-back style of construction, which replaced the shanks with long pins, probably for use on lapels and ties, began to appear.

One common practice that survived until recent times on campaign buttons and badges was to include the image of George Washington with that of the candidate in question.

Some of the most famous campaign buttons are those made for Abraham Lincoln. Memorial buttons commemorating Lincoln's inaugurations and other life events, including his birth and death, were also made, and are also considered highly collectible.

See also
Koumpounophobia, fear of buttons
Button collecting

References

Bibliography

External links

Button-making in Birmingham, England in the 1800s
Scans of original 1830–1940 US patents for buttons & related tools & machinery
Online collection of historical buttons at the Button Museum

Fashion accessories
Types of jewellery
Parts of clothing
Sewing
Textile closures
History of clothing